The Peppermint Beach Club was a 1,000-capacity music venue located in Virginia Beach, Virginia. The club hosted numerous famous artists before closing its doors in 1994. A few of the artists that performed at the Peppermint Beach Club include B.B. King, Pantera, Nine Inch Nails, Blue Öyster Cult, Motörhead, Body Count, Dave Matthews Band, Bob Seger and Ace Frehley. The structure was completed in 1926 and has seen many different uses over the years. It was not until the early-1960s that it received its famous name.

References

Music venues in Virginia
Music venues completed in 1926
Buildings and structures in Virginia Beach, Virginia
Demolished buildings and structures in Virginia